Scott Ethan "Scotty" Allen (born February 8, 1949) is a retired American figure skater. He is the 1964 Olympic bronze medalist, the 1965 world silver medalist, and the 1964 and 1966 U.S. national champion.

The son of Swedish figure skating champion Sonja Fuhrman, Allen made his national debut at the age of nine, winning the silver medal in the novice division at the 1959 U.S. Championships. At that time he was the youngest competitor ever to skate in the Championships.

He won the bronze medal at the 1964 Winter Olympics two days before his 15th birthday, becoming the youngest medalist at the Winter Olympics. He still holds the record for the youngest male medalist and the youngest individual medalist.

He represented the Skating Club of New York in competition. After retiring from competitions Allen attended Harvard University, graduating in 1971, and then Columbia Business School. He worked for more than 30 years at his stepfather's clothing company, Corbin Ltd., eventually becoming its vice-president of research and development. As of early 2014, he resides in New York City.

Competitive highlights

References

1949 births
American male single skaters
Harvard University alumni
Figure skaters at the 1964 Winter Olympics
Olympic bronze medalists for the United States in figure skating
Living people
Sportspeople from Newark, New Jersey
Olympic medalists in figure skating
World Figure Skating Championships medalists
Medalists at the 1964 Winter Olympics
Columbia Business School alumni